The St. Vital Victorias are a junior ice hockey team based in Winnipeg, Manitoba, Canada. They are part of the Manitoba Major Junior Hockey League (MMJHL).

History

The St. Vital Victorias were named in the memory of Company Sergeant-Major John Robert Osborn, V. C. Originally from Norfolk, England, Osborn settled in St. Vital and served with the 1st Battalion of the Winnipeg Grenadiers in World War II. On September 19, 1941, during an attack against the Japanese at Jardine's Lookout and Mount Butler, Hong Kong, the enemy began to throw grenades. Osborn displayed the highest quality of heroism and sacrifice. After picking up several live grenades and hurling them back at the enemy, he threw himself on a grenade in order to save the lives of his comrades. Osborn was posthumously awarded the Victoria Cross, the British Empire's highest military decoration for bravery and gallantry.

Set on a black hockey puck background, the white St. V. is joined with the red V for "Victorias". The positioning of the V's symbolizes the unity of the Junior Hockey team with affiliated Community Clubs, the AA Vic teams, and the community in general.  The white colour of the St. V. symbolizes the purity associated with the name SAINT.  The red V symbolizes the courage of the man whose confirmed honour promoted the name of the team.  The flow action motion of the stylized letters symbolizes the spirit of the game of hockey, and, specifically, of Victoria teams.

The St. Vital Minor Hockey Association was created in 1972, to administer minor hockey in the area. Three years later, the Junior Victorias were formed, as the club joined the Manitoba Major Junior Hockey League (MMJHL) for the team's inaugural campaign in 1975-76.

The Junior Vics fall under the regulations of Hockey Manitoba, operating as a community-owned club. St. Vital is located in the southeastern section of Winnipeg, and the Association comprises the Dakota, Glenlee, Glenwood, Greendell, Norberry, and Windsor Community Centres.

Season-by-season record
Note: GP = Games Played, W = Wins, L = Losses, T = Ties, OTL = Overtime Losses, GF = Goals for, GA = Goals against

Championships

Jack Mackenzie Trophy (playoffs) 
 2003-04

Art Moug Trophy (regular season) 
 1990-91, 2003–04, 2005–06

References

External links 
 St. Vital Jr. Victorias

Ice hockey teams in Winnipeg
St. Vital, Winnipeg